In horse racing and greyhound racing, an ante-post bet is a bet placed before the horse/greyhound racing course's betting market has opened, and is made on the expectation that the price of the horse/greyhound is presently more favorable than it will be when the course's market opens. Generally, this includes any bet placed before the day of the race. Ante-post betting, unlike starting price betting, carries the additional risk that the original bet will be forfeited, rather than returned, if the wagered horse fails to run.

The ante in ante-post is derived from the Latin ante (meaning "before"), but the post is not the Latin post (meaning "after"). Instead, it is derived from the nineteenth century Betting Post, a stake that was traditionally fixed somewhere on the course ground like a sign-post to signal the beginning of fixed betting to bettors. Bettors would then queue in their carriages in front of the Betting Post.

Ante-post bets represent only a small fraction of bets placed by British bookmakers. For ante-post bets, bookmakers set competing prices, because they cannot fix prices to racecourse prices. In consequence, ante-post prices often vary significantly between bookmakers, and bettors will pick the most favorable price from among them. This means that ante-bets are often less profitable. However, they often afford bookmakers significantly more press coverage, due to the variances in price.

References

Bibliography

Horse racing terminology
Wagering